Hydromya dorsalis is a species of fly in the family Sciomyzidae. It is found in the Palearctic. It is the only species in the genus. Males have two elongated processes on the anterior margin of the fourth abdominal sternite. Larvae of Hydromya dorsalis are adapted for aquatic life and prey on aquatic  pulmonate snails: Galba truncatula, Lymnaea sp. and Stagnicola palustris.
Adults are found on vegetation all year round but the main flight period is April to October. H. dorsalis is known from most of the Palaearctic and some parts
of the Afrotropics countries.

References

External links
Images representing Hydromya dorsalis at BOLD

Sciomyzidae
Insects described in 1775
Taxa named by Johan Christian Fabricius
Muscomorph flies of Europe